"Kurage, Nagareboshi" (クラゲ、流れ星; "Jellyfish, Shooting Star") is Japanese pop singer Ai Otsuka's 18th single, released on 10 September 2008. It will include a CD-only and CD + DVD format, as well as four different covers to celebrate her 5-year anniversary. There will be a 5th anniversary limited edition CD-only and CD + DVD version, as well as regular CD-only and CD + DVD versions. It is described as a "heartwarming ballad for the summer". The 5th anniversary covers pay homage to the covers of her debut single, "Momo no hanabira", whose release this single is meant to commemorate. Kurage, Nagareboshi is similar in style to "Kingyo Hanabi" and "Planetarium"; people often group the three songs together. It was used as the theme song for the TBS series, Koisuru Hanikami!.

The first pressing will include a written comment card and a jacket sticker.

Track listing

"Kurage, Nagareboshi" is a ballad to mark the end of the summer. "H2O" is an upbeat pop/rock song, as an upbeat song is often released with a ballad single to equalize the mood [the same vice versa—i.e. "Happy Days" had "Hoshikuzu" and "Rocket Sneaker / One × Time" had "One × Time"]. "Ame no Tsubu, Waltz: Love Music" is a new song reprising the chorus of "Love Music" found on Love Cook.

5th anniversary covers

Charts

Oricon Sales Chart (Japan)

References

Ai Otsuka songs
2008 singles
Songs written by Ai Otsuka
Avex Trax singles
2008 songs